Beni Sidel is a village in the Rif mountain range in northern Morocco. It is situated east of the city of Nador, the provincial capital.

Notable people
 Ahmed Aboutaleb, Dutch-Moroccan politician, mayor of Rotterdam
 Youssef Mokhtari, Moroccan footballer
Mohamed El Jerroudi, Poet end Writer Au Editions du Cygne, Paris

References

Cities in Morocco